Kino Polska is a television channel which broadcasts Polish movies and series. For a while, the TV station aired Polish animated shows including Hip-Hip and Hurra, which made its debut there.

References

External links 
 

Television channels in Poland
Television channels and stations established in 2003